Joelle is a feminine given name, and may refer to:
 Joelle, actor and singer
 Joelle Behlok, Lebanese television presenter and winner Miss Lebanon 1997
 Joelle Carter (born 1972), American actress
 Joelle Fishman (born 1946), American politician, writer and editor
 Joelle Fletcher (born 1990), American television personality and real estate developer
 Joelle Forte (born 1986), American figure skater
 Joelle Franzmann (born 1978), German triathlete
 Joelle Garguilo, American journalist, host, digital journalist and reporter
 Joelle Hadjia (born 1990), Australian singer
 Joelle Khoury (born 1963), Lebanese pianist, jazz and contemporary classical music composer
 Joelle King (born 1988), New Zealand squash player
 Joelle Murray (born 1986), Scottish footballer
 Joelle Siwa (born 2003), American dancer, singer, and YouTuber
 Joelle Wallach (born 1946), American composer

See also 
 Joel (given name)
 Joëlle (given name)

Feminine given names
English feminine given names
Arabic feminine given names